Danny Lyons (1860 – August 21, 1888) was, along with Danny Driscoll, the leader of the Whyos street gang during the 1870s and 1880s.

Whyos Gang
A prominent member of the Whyos Gang, a New York City street gang, Lyons led the gang with co-leader Danny Driscoll at their height during the late nineteenth century. Lyons, who was hired for crimes ranging from assault to murder, also supported three prostitutes, Lizzie the Dove, Bunty Kate, and Gentle Maggie. When the three women were unable to earn enough money Lyons hired Kitty McGown away from rival pimp Joseph Quinn.

Murder of Joseph Quinn
Joseph Quinn soon began looking for Lyons and on July 5, 1887, Lyons killed Quinn during a gunfight between them. Lyons was captured several months later and, while it seemed to be self-defense on the part of Lyons, he was executed by hanging on August 21, 1888. However, it has been suspected local authorities used the incident as an excuse to execute the well known criminal. While Kitty McGown and Bunty Kate quickly found another pimp, Lizzie the Dove and Gentle Maggie went into mourning. The two later got into an argument while toasting Lyons at a Bowery tavern and Gentle Maggie stabbed Lizzie the Dove in the throat, killing her. As Lizzie the Dove lay dying she was said to have told Gentle Maggie that she would "meet you in hell and there scratch your eyes out".

Death
Danny Lyons was executed in The Tombs Prison in New York City on August 21, 1888.

See also
 Capital punishment in New York (state)
 Capital punishment in the United States
 List of people executed in New York

Further reading
Sifakis, Carl. Encyclopedia of American Crime, New York. Facts on File Inc., 1982

1860 births
1888 deaths
1887 murders in the United States
19th-century executions by New York (state)
American people executed for murder
19th-century executions by the United States
Whyos
American gangsters of Irish descent
People executed by New York (state) by hanging
19th-century executions of American people
People convicted of murder by New York (state)